The Originals is an American fantasy supernatural drama television series that began airing on The CW on October 3, 2013. It is a spin-off of The Vampire Diaries and the first television series expansion of the franchise based on its parent series. The series follows vampire-werewolf hybrid Klaus Mikaelson as he and his family become embroiled in the supernatural politics of the French Quarter of New Orleans.

On May 10, 2017, The CW renewed the series for a fifth season. On July 20, 2017, it was announced by series creator Julie Plec ahead of Comic Con that the series' fifth season would be its last. The final season began airing on April 18, 2018, and finished on August 1, 2018.

Series overview
The Originals, a spin-off of The Vampire Diaries, centers on three of the Mikaelson siblings: Klaus, Elijah, and Rebekah. The Mikaelson family are also commonly known as "the Originals" due to the fact that they are the first vampires ever to exist. Klaus is the son of a witch and a werewolf, and his quest to unleash his hybrid nature was detailed in The Vampire Diaries. The backdoor pilot, "The Originals", which aired on April 25, 2013, also revealed that the werewolf Hayley, with whom Klaus had a drunken one-night stand in season 4 of The Vampire Diaries, is pregnant with his child the first ever tribrid. Elijah, Klaus, Rebekah and Hayley are all introduced in The Vampire Diaries as part of main or recurring cast from season 3 or 4 unlike the other cast of The Originals who are not introduced until the backdoor pilot or later on in the series.

The series begins with the Mikaelson siblings returning to the city of New Orleans for the first time since 1919, where a pregnant Hayley has also settled and is under capture by the witches who use her to manipulate Klaus into helping them against Marcel's iron fist. Having originally built the French Quarter, they had been forced to abandon it when fleeing from their vengeful father, Mikael, who wished to kill them all and end the vampire species which he viewed as unnatural and evil. In their absence, Klaus's former protégé and adoptive son and Rebekah's former lover, Marcel, took charge of the French Quarter as self-proclaimed king. Klaus resolves that they must take down Marcel and get back the city that once belonged to them while protecting their city from a war brewing between vampires, werewolves, and witches.

The first season describes how Klaus's mystical child is going to be born and speaks of the threats that the Originals together must keep her safe from. It also details the war between vampires, witches and werewolves. The series ends with the child being born – a baby girl named Hope and being given to Rebekah to hide and protect after Klaus and Hayley fake her death to ensure her safety. Hayley is turned into a hybrid through Hope's blood after being murdered when giving birth.

The second season deals with the return of Mikael and Esther, the Mikaelson siblings' parents, the arrival of Dahlia, sister of Esther who threatens Hope's life as she wishes to take her and train her in her image as she did with Freya the supposedly dead first-born daughter of Mikael and Esther who was said to die due to the cold winter, who shows up to help the Mikaelsons against Dahlia, having been kidnapped by her a few years after her birth after Esther promised Freya to her after birth but did not deliver.

The third season begins with the return of Lucien Castle, the first vampire sired by Klaus. Lucien tells Klaus about a prophecy that speaks of the Mikaelsons' downfall through friend, foe and family. In an effort to battle the Mikaelsons, Lucien works with Tristan de Martel and his sister Aurora – Klaus' first love, the first vampires sired by Elijah and Rebekah respectively. This season sees the death of Hayley's husband werewolf Jackson by Tristan and the death of Camille by Lucien. This season is also the first one to have a crossover episode with The Vampire Diaries, with Stefan Salvatore coming to New Orleans seeking aid.

The fourth season takes place five years after the third season. Marcel, now an Upgraded Original Vampire due to Lucien's creation, is ruling the city with an iron fist once more, while Hayley cures Freya, Elijah, Rebekah, and Kol. Klaus suffers at Marcel's hand as the other Mikaelson siblings strive to save him. But the appearance of an evil ancient mystical menace called the Hollow puts them all at risk, especially Hope who is targeted for her magical abilities and tribrid nature. It is later revealed in the season that the Hollow created the first werewolves which Hayley descends from. Hope is seven years old here and starting to develop magical abilities which Freya helps her control and use.

The fifth and final season of the series takes place seven years after the fourth season. Hope, now a teenager, is studying at the Salvatore School for the Young and Gifted. The other Mikaelsons are living their own lives separately, trying to keep the Hollow at bay through their distance. But when Klaus and an amnesiac Elijah meet, Hayley goes missing and Nazi vampires emerge the family all return to New Orleans to fight these new brewing threats. This season also acts as a soft backdoor pilot through small incorprations of the Salvatore School and future Legacies characters Alaric, Landon Kirby and the Saltzman twins as younger versions.

Cast and characters

 Joseph Morgan as Klaus Mikaelson: The self-proclaimed King of the French Quarter of New Orleans and the Original Hybrid: half-Original Vampire and half-werewolf. As the son of a witch and a werewolf alongside being a vampire by magic, Klaus is one of the most powerful and feared supernatural beings in history – he is over 1000 years old. He has a soft spot for his family, especially for Rebekah and Hope, his daughter with Hayley. He is the adoptive father of Marcel, his former protégé whom he saved from slavery. He eventually develops feelings for Cami, a bartender and psychology student. He and Elijah kill each other in the series finale to destroy the Hollow, an ancient spirit that was transferred from Hope's body to Elijah and Klaus's to protect Hope. The character is first introduced in The Vampire Diaries season 2.
 Daniel Gillies as Elijah Mikaelson: An Original Vampire and Klaus's older maternal half-brother. He is shown to be extremely suave, always sporting a suit, and level-headed compared to Klaus's more heated tendencies. He is also known as the "Noble Brother". He harbours romantic affections for Hayley which she returns. In season 5 he portrays an alternate Elijah after being memory wiped at the end of season 4. He and Klaus kill each other in the series finale to destroy the Hollow, an ancient spirit that was transferred from Hope's body to Klaus's. The character is first introduced in The Vampire Diaries season 2.
 Claire Holt as Rebekah Mikaelson (season 1; special guest star seasons 2–5): An Original Vampire and Klaus's younger maternal half-sister. She is Klaus's favourite and the youngest of the Mikaelson siblings after the death of Henrik. At one time, she was in a secret, forbidden romantic relationship with Marcel. Despite her unwavering love for her family, she desires to find love and start a family of her own, which is complicated by her family name and vampire status. She eventually leaves New Orleans to pursue a simpler life outside of her family. Holt departs the main cast near the end of season 1 due to wanting to spend more times with her family but guest-starred sporadically in every season since. In the season 5 premiere, Marcel proposes to her, and in the series finale, she accepts. Klaus also ensures before his death that she can get the cure to make her human so she can have children and a human life with Marcel. Maisie Richardson-Sellers portrayed Rebekah during the second half of season 2 and one episode of season 3, when Rebekah possessed the witch Eva Sinclair's body. The character is first introduced in The Vampire Diaries season 3. 
 Phoebe Tonkin as Hayley Marshall: Originally a werewolf, later a hybrid, who conceived a daughter with Klaus named Hope following a one night stand with Klaus in The Vampire Diaries creating the first ever tribrid – witch (from Klaus' mother) Vampire/hybrid (from Klaus) and werewolf (from Hayley and Klaus). She is revealed to be the long-lost Alpha of her werewolf bloodline. Later, she rises to become the Alpha of the entire Crescent pack when the Alphas of all the other bloodlines bow down before her. She is initially reluctant to be involved with the Mikaelsons, but is eventually accepted into the family and accepts them in return. She reciprocates Elijah's romantic feelings but marries Jackson Kenner to unite their packs despite her feelings for Elijah which runs throughout all 5 seasons. Her birth name, as revealed in season 1, is Andrea Labonair. She sacrifices herself to save Klaus and Hope in season 5 from the vampire Nazis. The character is first introduced in The Vampire Diaries season 4. 
 Charles Michael Davis as Marcel Gerard: A vampire and former slave. He was turned by Klaus, his adoptive father and former mentor. He has a romantic past with both Rebekah and Cami. His relationship with the Mikaelsons is complicated due to his history with them and philosophical differences. They are often adversarial as Klaus and Marcel constantly struggle for power over the French Quarter of New Orleans but always care for one another which often stops them pushing each other too far. He rescues Davina from being sacrificed and takes her under his wing as his adoptive daughter following the example of Klaus who similarly adopted Marcel to rescue him. Towards the end of the third season, Marcel is transformed into an Upgraded Original Vampire, a vampire far more powerful than the Originals themselves and has deadly venom in his fangs, thus fulfilling a Prophecy said at the start of the season. In the season 5 premiere, he proposes to Rebekah, and in the series finale, she accepts. In Legacies, it is revealed they are now married. The character was first introduced in The Vampire Diaries backdoor pilot.
 Daniella Pineda as Sophie Deveraux (season 1): A powerful witch of the French Quarter, Monique's aunt and Jane-Anne's sister. She is murdered by Monique in season 1, after Monique is resurrected as a result of the Harvest ritual.The character is first introduced in The Vampire Diaries backdoor pilot.
 Leah Pipes as Cami O'Connell (seasons 1–3; special guest star seasons 4–5): A human bartender with a psychology degree who acts as a therapist and transcriber for and eventually becomes romantically involved with Klaus Mikaelson. For decades, her family has helped protect the human locals of the French Quarter from all things supernatural. Before developing feelings for Klaus, Cami was in a relationship with Marcel. She becomes a vampire in season 3, and is bitten by the Upgraded Original Vampire Lucien Castle not long after; she dies as a result of his bite near the end of season 3. The character is first introduced in The Vampire Diaries backdoor pilot.
 Danielle Campbell as Davina Claire (seasons 1–3; special guest star seasons 4–5): A powerful young witch and Marcel's adoptive daughter who becomes Regent of all witch covens in New Orleans. She doesn't much care for the Mikaelsons and seeks to destroy them with Marcel's help until she unknowingly falls in love with Kol Mikaelson, one of the Mikaelsons who was resurrected at the end of season 1 following his death in The Vampire Diaries season 4. She and Kol marry between seasons 4 and 5 and eventually settle down away from New Orleans. 
 Yusuf Gatewood as Vincent Griffith (seasons 2–5; guest star season 1): A witch once possessed by Finn, the eldest brother among the Mikaelson siblings. He is the ex-husband of Eva Sinclair, the witch Rebekah possessed. He succeeds Davina as Regent of all witch covens in New Orleans. He fathers Keelin and Freya's son Nik in season 5. The character is first introduced as Finn in his body in the season 1 final episode and as Vincent in season 2.
 Riley Voelkel as Freya Mikaelson (seasons 3–5; recurring season 2): Klaus's long-lost maternal older half-sister and an immensely powerful and skilled thousand-year-old witch. She is the eldest of the Mikaelson siblings and returns to the Mikaelson family after breaking free from their Aunt Dahlia's control and immortality curse in season 2. She marries Keelin, a werewolf, in season 5; they have a son, Nik (named after Niklaus 'Klaus' Mikaelson – the name is revealed in Legacies), with Vincent Griffith being the surrogate father. The character is first introduced in season 2 but is mentioned in The Vampire Diaries as the dead first Mikaelson sibling but is not named until season 2.
 Danielle Rose Russell as Hope Mikaelson (season 5): The teenage daughter of Klaus and Hayley, who is an extremely powerful supernatural being as she holds the three-fold lineage of vampire, werewolf, and witch. Following the conclusion of The Originals, Russell stars in the spin-off Legacies, based on Hope's adventures at the Salvatore Boarding House for the Young and Gifted – a school which is set up at the end of The Vampire Diaries by Alaric and Caroline to provide a school for the supernatural. 
 Young Hope is portrayed by Summer Fontana (recurring season 4, guest season 5).
 Baby Hope is portrayed by uncredited infant actors in seasons 1–3.
 Steven Krueger as Josh Rosza (season 5; recurring seasons 1–4): A visitor to New Orleans who is soon turned into a vampire by Marcel. He befriends Davina and later serves as Marcel's lieutenant. He enters a relationship with Aiden, a werewolf who is murdered by Dahlia to frame Klaus in season 2. In season 5, he is injected with advanced werewolf venom into the heart and dies not long after in Marcel's arms. He then reunites with his dead boyfriend Aiden in the afterlife. The character is first introduced in The Originals.

Episodes

Production
On January 11, 2013, it was announced that a backdoor pilot focused on the Originals, starring Joseph Morgan as Klaus and titled The Originals would air sometime in April for a potential series pick-up for the 2013–2014 season. On April 26, 2013, The Originals was confirmed for a full series. This second spin-off attempt will be overseen by Julie Plec, with no involvement by Kevin Williamson. The Originals was officially picked up by The CW on April 26, 2013, for the 2013–14 season. Season one of The Originals was set to premiere on Tuesday, October 15. However, on July 29, 2013, The CW announced that the series premiere would instead air on October 3, 2013, following the fifth-season premiere of The Vampire Diaries in order to attract fans of the series. On October 10, 2013, the CW ordered three additional scripts for the series. On November 11, 2013, the CW decided to order a full season for The Originals.

Following her March 11 episode Claire Holt left the main cast. Holt confirmed that she would be returning to the show, but that she needed to spend time with her family first.

Reception

Ratings

Awards and nominations

The Originals: The Awakening

In November 2014, a web series titled The Originals: The Awakening was released as the fourth show in the franchise. The series explores the character Kol Mikaelson and his relationships with his siblings. Flashing back to 1914, Kol is on a quest to form an alliance with the witches of the French Quarter. Awakening gives answers to some questions about Kol's past, including the origins of his rivalry with his family and the unique backstory he has with the New Orleans witches. Each webisode is approximately two minutes long. The series concluded on December 8, 2014. To date, The Originals: The Awakening is the only web series in The Vampire Diaries franchise.

Novels
On January 27, 2015, the first book in a series of novels based on the show was released. The Rise, The Loss, and The Resurrection make up the three novels in The Originals series written by Julie Plec.

Spin-off

In August 2017, it was announced that a spin-off focusing on Hope Mikaelson (Danielle Rose Russell), the daughter of Klaus and Hayley, was in development. Julie Plec, co-creator of The Vampire Diaries and creator of The Originals, wrote the script and is credited with creating the series. It was the third series in The Vampire Diaries universe. In January 2018, it was revealed that filming for the pilot would go into production in the second quarter of 2018. It was announced in March 2018 that the spin-off was in fact ordered to pilot, but instead of a traditional pilot, Plec would be delivering a fifteen-minute pilot presentation of the series to The CW. It was also announced that The Vampire Diaries veteran Matt Davis would star in the project along with Aria Shahghasemi, Quincy Fouse, Jenny Boyd, and Kaylee Bryant. Shahghasemi debuted in the fifth season of The Originals as Hope's human friend and romantic interest Landon who lives in Mystic Falls and works at the Mystic Grill.

On May 11, 2018, it was announced that the spin-off, titled Legacies, had been ordered to series for the 2018–19 season. The show centers around "a 17-year-old Hope, along with Alaric's twin daughters, and other young witches, vampires, and werewolves" as they come of age at the Salvatore Boarding School for the Young and Gifted. The show featured appearances from many characters from The Vampire Diaries, along with characters from The Originals. On May 12, 2022, it was reported that the fourth season would be its last.

See also
Vampire film
List of vampire television series

References

External links

 
 
 

 
The Vampire Diaries
2013 American television series debuts
2018 American television series endings
American fantasy television series
American fantasy drama television series
2010s American drama television series
2010s American teen drama television series
2010s American horror television series
2010s American supernatural television series
American television spin-offs
The CW original programming
Dark fantasy television series
English-language television shows
Serial drama television series
Television series about families
Television series about siblings
Television series by Alloy Entertainment
Television series by Warner Bros. Television Studios
Television series by CBS Studios
Television shows set in New Orleans
Television shows filmed in Georgia (U.S. state)
Vampires in television
Television about werewolves
Witchcraft in television
Television series about vampires